Park Ridge State High School is a coeducational public secondary school based in the suburb of Park Ridge, a suburb of the local government area of Logan City, south of the Brisbane metropolitan area in Queensland, Australia. The school has a total enrolment of more than 1100 students per year, with an official count of 1175 students in 2017.

Since 2015, the school's role of Principal has been held by Sharon Amos. The school also consists of four Deputy Principals, eleven Heads of Department, two Guidance Officers, one school Chaplain and one Youth Support Coordinator.

Curriculum

Junior Secondary (Years 7-9)

Year 7

Year 7 students at Park Ridge State High School undertake the compulsory core subjects of English, Mathematics, Science, History/Geography, Health & Physical Education and Languages Other Than English (German or Indonesian). Year 7 students also undertake two Arts subjects and two Technology subjects.

Year 8

Year 8 students at Park Ridge State High School undertake the compulsory core subjects of English, Mathematics, Science, History/Geography and Health & Physical Education. Elective subjects available to Year 8 students include:

 The Arts
 Dance
 Drama
 Music
 Art
 LOTE
 German
 Indonesian
 Technology
 Business & ICT (IBus)
 Home Economics
 Industrial Technology & Design

Year 9

Year 9 students at Park Ridge State High School undertake compulsory core subjects consistent with those of Year 8 as well as three elective subjects. Elective subjects available to Year 9 students include:

 The Arts
 Dance
 Drama
 Music
 Art
 LOTE
 German
 Indonesian
 Technology
 Business (BizTek)
 Home Economics - Food Studies
 Wood Technology
 Metal Technology
 Graphics

Year 10

Year 10 students at Park Ridge State High School undertake the compulsory core subjects of English, Mathematics and Science as well as three elective subjects. Elective subjects available to Year 10 students include:

 Art
 Business
 Dance
 Digital Technologies
 Drama
 Early Childhood Studies
 Engineering Technology/Design Technology
 Fashion & Textiles
 Food & Nutrition
 Health & Physical Education
 History
 Legal Studies
 LOTE (Indonesian)
 Media
 Metal Technology
 Music (IMEx)
 Recreational Studies
 Technology & Applied Science
 Tourism Studies
 Wood Technology

Senior Secondary (Years 11 & 12)

Queensland Curriculum & Assessment Authority (QCAA) subjects available to senior students at Park Ridge State High School include:

 Ancient History
 Biological Science
 Chemistry
 English
 Film & Television
 Indonesian
 Legal Studies
 Mathematics A
 Mathematics B
 Mathematics C
 Music
 Physical Education
 Physics
 Visual Art

Authority Registered and Vocational Education & Training (VET) subjects available to senior students include:

 Building and Construction Skills
 Business Studies
 Certificate II in Photography
 Certificate III in Fitness
 Dance in Practice
 Drama in Practice
 Early Childhood Studies
 Engineering Skills
 English Communication
 Furnishing Skills
 Hospitality Practices
 Industrial Graphics Skills
 Information & Communications Technology
 Media in Practice
 Pre-vocational Mathematics
 Recreation
 Tourism
 Visual Arts in Practice

Extra-curricular activities

Extra-curricular activities at Park Ridge State High School include:

 Student Council
 Fundraisers
 Environmental Plan (focus on assembly, funding proposal, recycling bins, media presentations, procurement of more security cameras)
 Primary Leadership workshops
 Student-run assemblies
 Sporting clubs
 Instrumental music
 Choir
 PRSHS show/musical
 Talent Quest
 Arts Night
 Tutorials
 AFL Excellence Academy

References

External links
 

Schools in South East Queensland
Public high schools in Queensland
Schools in Logan City
Educational institutions established in 1991
1991 establishments in Australia